The Rosenhan experiment or Thud experiment was an experiment conducted to determine the validity of psychiatric diagnosis. The participants feigned hallucinations to enter psychiatric hospitals but acted normally afterwards. They were diagnosed with psychiatric disorders and were given antipsychotic medication. The study was conducted by psychologist David Rosenhan, a Stanford University professor, and published by the journal Science in 1973 under the title "On Being Sane in Insane Places". It is considered an important and influential criticism of psychiatric diagnosis, and broached the topic of wrongful involuntary commitment. Rosenhan along with 8 other people (5 men and 3 women) went into these 12 hospitals across 5 states along the West coast of the US. The pseudo-patients who were only admitted for a short period of time went to a different hospital, hence they went to 12 hospitals but there were only 9 participants altogether. 

Rosenhan described his study as having two parts. The first part involved the use of healthy associates or "pseudopatients" (three women and six men, including Rosenhan himself) who briefly feigned auditory hallucinations in an attempt to gain admission to 12 psychiatric hospitals in five states in the United States. All were admitted and diagnosed with psychiatric disorders. After admission, the pseudopatients acted normally and told staff that they no longer experienced any additional hallucinations. As a condition of their release, all the patients were forced to admit to having a mental illness and had to agree to take antipsychotic medication. The average time that the patients spent in the hospital was 19 days. All but one were diagnosed with schizophrenia "in remission" before their release.

The second part of his study involved a hospital administration challenging Rosenhan to send pseudopatients to its facility, whose staff asserted that they would be able to detect the pseudopatients. Rosenhan agreed, and in the following weeks 41 out of 193 new patients were identified as potential pseudopatients, with 19 of these receiving suspicion from at least one psychiatrist and one other staff member. Rosenhan sent no pseudopatients to the hospital.

While listening to a lecture by R. D. Laing, who was associated with the anti-psychiatry movement, Rosenhan conceived of the experiment as a way to test the reliability of psychiatric diagnoses. The study concluded "it is clear that we cannot distinguish the sane from the insane in psychiatric hospitals" and also illustrated the dangers of dehumanization and labeling in psychiatric institutions. It suggested that the use of community mental health facilities which concentrated on specific problems and behaviors rather than psychiatric labels might be a solution, and recommended education to make psychiatric workers more aware of the social psychology of their facilities.

Pseudopatient experiment
Rosenhan himself and seven mentally healthy associates, called "pseudopatients", attempted to gain admission to psychiatric hospitals by calling for an appointment and feigning auditory hallucinations. The hospital staff were not informed of the experiment. The pseudopatients included a psychology graduate student in his twenties, three psychologists, a pediatrician, a psychiatrist, a painter, and a housewife. None had a history of mental illness. Pseudopatients used pseudonyms, and those who worked in the mental health field were given false jobs in a different sector to avoid invoking any special treatment or scrutiny. Apart from giving false names and employment details, further biographical details were truthfully reported.

During their initial psychiatric assessment, the pseudopatients claimed to be hearing voices of the same sex as the patient which were often unclear, but which seemed to pronounce the words "empty", "hollow", or "thud", and nothing else. These words were chosen as they vaguely suggest some sort of existential crisis and for the lack of any published literature referencing them as psychotic symptoms. No other psychiatric symptoms were claimed. If admitted, the pseudopatients were instructed to "act normally", reporting that they felt fine and no longer heard voices. Hospital records obtained after the experiment indicate that all pseudopatients were characterized as friendly and cooperative by staff.

All were admitted, to 12 psychiatric hospitals across the United States, including rundown and underfunded public hospitals in rural areas, urban university-run hospitals with excellent reputations, and one expensive private hospital. Though presented with identical symptoms, seven were diagnosed with schizophrenia at public hospitals, and one with manic-depressive psychosis, a more optimistic diagnosis with better clinical outcomes, at the private hospital. Their stays ranged from 7 to 52 days, and the average was 19 days. All but one were discharged with a diagnosis of schizophrenia "in remission", which Rosenhan considered as evidence that mental illness is perceived as an irreversible condition creating a lifelong stigma rather than a curable illness.

Despite constantly and openly taking extensive notes on the behavior of the staff and other patients, none of the pseudopatients were identified as impostors by the hospital staff, although many of the other psychiatric patients seemed to be able to correctly identify them as impostors. In the first three hospitalizations, 35 of the total of 118 patients expressed a suspicion that the pseudopatients were sane, with some suggesting that the patients were researchers or journalists investigating the hospital. Hospital notes indicated that staff interpreted much of the pseudopatients' behavior in terms of mental illness. For example, one nurse labeled the note-taking of one pseudopatient as "writing behavior" and considered it pathological. The patients' normal biographies were recast in hospital records along the lines of what was expected of schizophrenics by the then-dominant theories of its cause.

The experiment required the pseudopatients to get out of the hospital on their own by getting the hospital to release them, though a lawyer was retained to be on call for emergencies when it became clear that the pseudopatients would not ever be voluntarily released on short notice. Once admitted and diagnosed, the pseudopatients were not able to obtain their release until they agreed with the psychiatrists that they were mentally ill and began taking antipsychotic medications, which they flushed down the toilet. No staff member reported that the pseudopatients were flushing their medication down the toilets.

Rosenhan and the other pseudopatients reported an overwhelming sense of dehumanization, severe invasion of privacy, and boredom while hospitalized. Their possessions were searched randomly, and they were sometimes observed while using the toilet. They reported that though the staff seemed to be well-meaning, they generally objectified and dehumanized the patients, often discussing patients at length in their presence as though they were not there, and avoiding direct interaction with patients except as strictly necessary to perform official duties. Some attendants were prone to verbal and physical abuse of patients when other staff were not present. A group of patients waiting outside the cafeteria half an hour before lunchtime were said by a doctor to his students to be experiencing "oral-acquisitive" psychiatric symptoms. Contact with doctors averaged 6.8 minutes per day.

Non-existent impostor experiment
For this experiment, Rosenhan used a well-known research and teaching hospital, whose staff had heard of the results of the initial study but claimed that similar errors could not be made at their institution. Rosenhan arranged with them that during a three-month period, one or more pseudopatients would attempt to gain admission and the staff would rate every incoming patient as to the likelihood they were an impostor. Out of 193 patients, 41 were considered to be impostors and a further 42 were considered suspect. In reality, Rosenhan had sent no pseudopatients; all patients suspected as impostors by the hospital staff were ordinary patients. This led to a conclusion that "any diagnostic process that lends itself too readily to massive errors of this sort cannot be a very reliable one."

Impact

Rosenhan published his findings in Science, in which he criticized the reliability of psychiatric diagnosis and the disempowering and demeaning nature of patient care experienced by the associates in the study. In addition, he described his work in a variety of news appearances, including to the BBC:

The experiment is argued to have "accelerated the movement to reform mental institutions and to deinstitutionalize as many mental patients as possible".

Criticisms
Many respondents to the publication defended psychiatry, arguing that as psychiatric diagnosis relies largely on the patient's report of their experiences, faking their presence no more demonstrates problems with psychiatric diagnosis than lying about other medical symptoms. In this vein, psychiatrist Robert Spitzer quoted Seymour S. Kety in a 1975 criticism of Rosenhan's study:

If I were to drink a quart of blood and, concealing what I had done, come to the emergency room of any hospital vomiting blood, the behavior of the staff would be quite predictable. If they labeled and treated me as having a bleeding peptic ulcer, I doubt that I could argue convincingly that medical science does not know how to diagnose that condition.

Kety also argued that psychiatrists should not necessarily be expected to assume that a patient is pretending to have mental illness, thus the study lacked realism. Rosenhan called this the "experimenter effect" or "expectation bias", something indicative of the problems he uncovered rather than a problem in his methodology.

Accusation of hoax
In The Great Pretender, a 2019 book on Rosenhan, author Susannah Cahalan questions the veracity and validity of the Rosenhan experiment. Examining documents left behind by Rosenhan after his death, Cahalan finds apparent distortion in the Science article: inconsistent data, misleading descriptions, and inaccurate or fabricated quotations from psychiatric records. Moreover, despite an extensive search, she is only able to identify two of the eight pseudopatients: Rosenhan himself, and a graduate student whose testimony is allegedly inconsistent with Rosenhan's description in the article. In light of Rosenhan's seeming willingness to bend the truth in other ways regarding the experiment, Cahalan questions whether some or all of the six other pseudopatients might have been simply invented by Rosenhan. In February 2023, Andrew Scull of the University of California at San Diego published an article in the peer-reviewed journal History of Psychiatry in support of Cahalan's allegations.

Related experiments
In 1887 American investigative journalist Nellie Bly feigned symptoms of mental illness to gain admission to a lunatic asylum and report on the terrible conditions therein. The results were published as Ten Days in a Mad-House.

In 1968 Maurice K. Temerlin split 25 psychiatrists into two groups and had them listen to an actor portraying a character of normal mental health. One group was told that the actor "was a very interesting man because he looked neurotic, but actually was quite psychotic" while the other was told nothing. Sixty percent of the former group diagnosed psychoses, most often schizophrenia, while none of the control group did so.

In 1988, Loring and Powell gave 290 psychiatrists a transcript of a patient interview and told half of them that the patient was black and the other half white; they concluded of the results that "clinicians appear to ascribe violence, suspiciousness, and dangerousness to black clients even though the case studies are the same as the case studies for the white clients."

In 2004, psychologist Lauren Slater claimed to have conducted an experiment very similar to Rosenhan's for her book Opening Skinner's Box. Slater wrote that she had presented herself at 9 psychiatric emergency rooms with auditory hallucinations, resulting in being diagnosed "almost every time" with psychotic depression. However, when challenged to provide evidence of actually conducting her experiment, she could not. The serious methodologic and other concerns regarding Slater's work appeared as a series of responses to a journal report, in the same journal.

In 2008, the BBC's Horizon science program performed a similar experiment over two episodes entitled "How Mad Are You?". The experiment involved ten subjects, five with previously diagnosed mental health conditions, and five with no such diagnosis. They were observed by three experts in mental health diagnoses and their challenge was to identify the five with mental health problems solely from their behavior, without speaking to the subjects or learning anything of their histories. The experts correctly diagnosed two of the ten patients, misdiagnosed one patient, and incorrectly identified two healthy patients as having mental health problems. Unlike the other experiments listed here, however, the aim of this journalistic exercise was not to criticize the diagnostic process, but to minimize the stigmatization of the mentally ill. It aimed to illustrate that people with a previous diagnosis of a mental illness could live normal lives with their health problems not obvious to observers from their behavior.

See also

 
 
 
 Psychiatric hospital § Undercover journalism

References

Notes

Bibliography

External links

On being sane in insane places
Rosenhan experiment summary
BBC Radio 4, "Mind Changers", Series 4 Episode 1: The Pseudo-Patient Study

1973 in science
Academic scandals
Anti-psychiatry
Experimental psychology
History of psychology
Psychiatric false diagnosis
Psychology experiments
Social problems in medicine